Mohammad Alee Murtaza  is a Bangladeshi academic. He served as the 9th Vice-chancellor of Bangladesh University of Engineering and Technology.

Education

Murtaza passed matriculation examination from Laksam High School in 1959 and intermediate examination from Comilla Government College in 1959 and 1961 respectively. He earned his bachelor's in civil Engineering in 1965 from the East Pakistan University of Engineering and Technology. He obtained his master's from Bangladesh University of Engineering and Technology in 1976 and his Ph.D. from University of Liverpool in 1982 under Commonwealth Scholarship.

Career
Murtaza worked as an assistant engineer in the 	East Pakistan Industrial Development Corporation from 1967 to 1973. In 1973, he joined as an assistant professor in the Department of Civil Engineering at Bangladesh University of Engineering and Technology and served as the vice-chancellor from August 30, 2002, until August 29, 2006.

References

Living people
1944 births
People from Noakhali District
Bangladesh University of Engineering and Technology alumni
Alumni of the University of Liverpool
Academic staff of Bangladesh University of Engineering and Technology
Vice-Chancellors of Bangladesh University of Engineering and Technology